Yaña Bäräskä is a rural locality (a derevnya) in Ätnä District, Tatarstan. The population was 40 as of 2010.

Geography 
 is located 22 km northwest of Olı Ätnä, district's administrative centre, and 99 km north of Qazan, republic's capital, by road.

History 
The village was established in the end of the 18th century or in the beginning of the 19th century.

Until 1860-s village's residents belonged to the social estate of state peasants.

By the beginning of the twentieth century, village had a mosque and a small shop.

Before the creation of the Tatar ASSR in 1920 was a part of Çar Uyezd of Qazan Governorate. Since 1920 was a part of Arça Canton; after the creation of districts in Tatar ASSR (Tatarstan) in Tuqay (1930–1935), Tuqay (former Qızıl Yul) (1935–1963),  Arça (1963–1990) and Ätnä districts.

References

External links 
 

Rural localities in Atninsky District